The Kargı Dam is a rock-fill embankment dam on the Sakarya River in Eskişehir Province, Turkey. The development was backed by the Turkish State Hydraulic Works. The primary purpose of the dam is hydroelectric power generation and it supports a 194 MW power station.

See also

List of dams and reservoirs in Turkey

References
DSI, State Hydraulic Works (Turkey), Retrieved December 16, 2009

Dams in Eskişehir Province
Hydroelectric power stations in Turkey
Dams completed in 2009